The  is a throw in judo. It is a variant of Seoi nage, and is one of the nineteen accepted techniques in Shinmeisho No Waza of Kodokan Judo.  It is classified as a hand throwing technique, or te-waza.  Ippon seoi nage literally means "one arm over the back throw", but has also been translated as a "one arm shoulder throw", as the opponent or uke is thrown over the thrower or tori's shoulder.

Description
Ippon seoi nage begins with one judo player (tori) breaking another's (uke's) balance in the forward direction. With one hand holding uke's arm, tori steps forward and turns inward. Tori then passes their arm up under uke's and clamps it. Tori lifts uke off of the ground and throws in the forward direction.

Similar techniques and variants
Ippon seoi nage is similar to morote seoi nage and eri seoi nage. They differ in that these throws use a two-handed grip. With morote seoi nage, tori grips the sleeve and opposite lapel, and with eri seoi nage tori grips the sleeve and lapel on the same side.

Seoi otoshi and hidari kata seoi are considered to be variations of ippon seoi nage. Hidari kata seoi is a variation of ippon seoi nage, where instead of tori maintaining their sleeve grip and going under the same arm, they maintain the lapel grip and go under uke's other arm.

See also
List of judo techniques
List of Kodokan judo techniques
List of Danzan-ryū techniques

References

Further reading
 Ohlenkamp, Neil (2006), Judo Unleashed, .

External links 
 International Judo Federation - Judo techniques - Ippon seoi nage

Martial art techniques
Wrestling
Judo technique
Throw (grappling)